Montañés is a Spanish surname. It can refer to:

 Albert Montañés, Spanish professional tennis player.
 Francesc Montañés
 Francisco Montañés
 Joaquín Montañés, Spanish footballer.
 Juan Martínez Montañés
 Mónica Montañés, Venezuelan screenwriter and journalist.

Spanish-language surnames